James Craggs the Younger  (9 April 168616 February 1721), was an English politician.

Life
Craggs was born at Westminster, the son of James Craggs the Elder. Part of his early life was spent abroad, where he made the acquaintance of George Louis, Elector of Hanover, afterwards King George I of Great Britain. In 1713 he became Member of Parliament for Tregony, in 1717 Secretary at War, and in the following year Secretary of State for the Southern Department. Craggs was implicated in the South Sea Bubble, but not so deeply as his father, whom he predeceased, dying on 16 February 1721, aged 34. Among Craggs's friends were Alexander Pope (who wrote the epitaph on his monument in Westminster Abbey), Joseph Addison and John Gay.

James Craggs left an illegitimate daughter, Harriot Craggs, by the noted dancer and actress Hester Santlow. Harriot married firstly in 1726 to Richard Eliot, having nine children including Edward Craggs-Eliot, 1st Baron Eliot and secondly in 1749 to John Hamilton by whom she had a son.

James Craggs also left two Illegitimate sons, each named James, by different mothers, Reference to these may be found in the Will of his uncle, Michael Richards, who left bequests to Harriot and to each of the sons. One of the sons died at sea in 1740 as a lieutenant in the Royal Navy under the name James Smith, but noted as being the natural son of the late Secretary Craggs.

In 1719 he was one of the original backers of the Royal Academy of Music, establishing a London opera company which commissioned numerous works from Handel, Bononcini and others.

References

External links

1686 births
1721 deaths
British Secretaries of State
Members of the Privy Council of Great Britain
Members of the Parliament of Great Britain for constituencies in Cornwall
British MPs 1713–1715
British MPs 1715–1722